Sian Smithson (born 9 October 1982) is a former field hockey player from Australia, who played as a forward.

Career

AHL
Smithson made her debut in the Australian Hockey League (AHL) in 2004 as a member of the WAIS Diamonds. In her debut year for the team, Smithson won a national title, scoring four goals in the Diamonds' campaign. Smithson continued to compete with the group until 2011, earning 5 national championships in the process.

International hockey

Under–21
In 2001, Smithson was a member of the Australia U–21 side, the Jillaroos. She represented the team at the FIH Junior World Cup in Buenos Aires, where she won a bronze medal.

Hockeyroos
Smithson made her senior international debut for the Hockeyroos in 2005, during a test series against Korea in Adelaide.

International goals

References

External links
Hockey Australia

1982 births
Living people
Australian female field hockey players
Female field hockey forwards
21st-century Australian women